Kutztown 1892 Public School Building is a historic school building located at Kutztown, Berks County, Pennsylvania. It was built in 1892, and is a two-story, brick and stone building in the Late Victorian style.  It has eight rooms and features a three-story bell tower and arched and pedimented porch supported by four columns.  A fire tower addition was built in 1936.  It served as a school annex until 1977, after which it housed the Kutztown Historical Society and community meeting hall.

The building was added to the National Register of Historic Places in 1980.

Kutztown Historical Society Museum
The Kutztown Historical Society purchased the building in 1979 and uses it as a museum of local history and as the society's headquarters.  The museum's collections include antique textile implements, toys, books, farm implements, fire equipment, clothing, schoolroom items, weapons and other items of area cultural and historical importance.

References

External links
Kutztown Historical Society website

School buildings on the National Register of Historic Places in Pennsylvania
School buildings completed in 1892
Defunct schools in Pennsylvania
Buildings and structures in Berks County, Pennsylvania
Museums in Berks County, Pennsylvania
National Register of Historic Places in Berks County, Pennsylvania